The Tiberias massacre took place on 2 October 1938, during the 1936–39 Arab revolt in Tiberias, then located in the British Mandate of Palestine and today is located in the State of Israel.

After infiltrating the Jewish Kiryat Shmuel neighbourhood, Arab rioters killed 19 Jews in Tiberias, 11 of whom were children. During the massacre, 70 armed Arabs set fire to Jewish homes and the local synagogue. In one house a mother and her five children were killed. The old beadle in the synagogue was stabbed to death, and another family of 4 was killed. At the time of the attack there were only 15 Jewish guards in the neighborhood of over 2,000 people. The coast of the Sea of Galilee remained unguarded, for it was the least expected direction for an attack. Two Jewish guards were killed in the attack.

The historian Shai Lachman has attributed the massacre to Abu Ibrahim al-Kabir.

A representative of the British mandate reported that: "It was systematically organized and savagely executed. Of the nineteen Jews killed, including women and children, all save four were stabbed to death. That night and the following day the troops engaged the raiding gangs". After the massacre, the Irgun proposed a joint retaliatory operation with Haganah to deter such events, but the latter group did not agree.

Tiberian Arabs murdered the Jewish mayor, Zaki Alhadif, on 27 October 1938. The Haganah sent a party, led by Yosef Avidar, a Haganah leader who later became a general (Aluf) in the Israel Defense Forces, to investigate the failed defense of the city.

See also
 Hebron massacre
 The Bloody Day in Jaffa
 List of killings and massacres in Mandatory Palestine

References 

1936–1939 Arab revolt in Palestine
Mass murder in 1938
1938 murders in Asia
1938 riots
1938 in Mandatory Palestine
Massacres in 1938
Massacres in Mandatory Palestine
Terrorism in Mandatory Palestine
Terrorist incidents in the 1930s
Anti-Jewish pogroms by Muslims
1938 Tiberias massacre
October 1938 events
Riots and civil disorder in Mandatory Palestine
1938 in Judaism
People murdered in Mandatory Palestine